Wellston is a city in Jackson County, Ohio, United States, in the southeastern part of the state. The population was 5,663 at the 2010 census.

History
Wellston was laid out and founded in 1873 on land owned by Harvey Wells.  Wells constructed a blast furnace in 1874, and the town was incorporated in 1876.  Wellston flourished for several years on the furnace and local mining industry, but most of the resources have now been depleted.

Geography
Wellston is located at  (39.119693, -82.534139).

Demographics

2010 census
As of the census of 2010, there were 5,663 people, 2,250 households, and 1,459 families living in the city. The racial makeup of the city was 97.7% White, 0.2% African American, 0.4% Native American, 0.2% Asian, 0.1% from other races, and 1.3% from two or more races. Hispanic or Latino of any race were 0.7% of the population.

There were 2,250 households, of which 35.7% had children under the age of 18 living with them, 41.9% were married couples living together, 16.3% had a female householder with no husband present, 6.6% had a male householder with no wife present, and 35.2% were non-families. 29.8% of all households were made up of individuals, and 13.3% had someone living alone who was 65 years of age or older. The average household size was 2.47 and the average family size was 3.03.

The median age in the city was 36.5 years. 25.6% of residents were under the age of 18; 9.4% were between the ages of 18 and 24; 24.8% were from 25 to 44; 25.3% were from 45 to 64; and 14.8% were 65 years of age or older. The gender makeup of the city was 46.8% male and 53.2% female.

2000 census
As of the census of 2000, there were 6,078 people, 2,359 households, and 1,644 families living in the city. The population density was 872.4 people per square mile (336.7/km2). There were 2,615 housing units at an average density of 375.3 per square mile (144.9/km2). The racial makeup of the city was 98.08% White, 0.36% African American, 0.28% Native American, 0.16% Asian, 0.21% from other races, and 0.90% from two or more races. Hispanic or Latino of any race were 0.61% of the population.

There were 2,359 households, out of which 34.6% had children under the age of 18 living with them, 48.6% were married couples living together, 15.8% had a female householder with no husband present, and 30.3% were non-families. 26.9% of all households were made up of individuals, and 13.2% had someone living alone who was 65 years of age or older. The average household size was 2.52 and the average family size was 3.02.

In the city the population was spread out, with 26.9% under the age of 18, 9.5% from 18 to 24, 26.8% from 25 to 44, 21.3% from 45 to 64, and 15.5% who were 65 years of age or older. The median age was 36 years. For every 100 females, there were 88.6 males. For every 100 females age 18 and over, there were 83.8 males.

The median income for a household in the city was $30,021, and the median income for a family was $34,488. Males had a median income of $28,514 versus $20,967 for females. The per capita income for the city was $13,476. About 15.8% of families and 18.8% of the population were below the poverty line, including 24.7% of those under age 18 and 14.6% of those age 65 or over.

Government
In October 2009, the Ohio state government declared the City of Wellston to be in a state of fiscal emergency "as defined by Section 118.03(A)(6) and 118.03(B) of the Ohio Revised Code" on the basis of a "treasury deficiency".

Economy
A General Mills plant in Wellston makes Totino's.

Education
The local school district, Wellston City Schools, operates the following schools:
Bundy Elementary School
Wellston High School
Wellston Intermediate School
Wellston Middle School

Private School
 St. Peter and St. Paul Catholic School

Wellston is served by the Sylvester Memorial Public Library. In 2005, the library loaned more than 70,000 items to its 10,000 cardholders, and it had total holdings of over 31,000 volumes with over 90 periodical subscriptions.

Notable people
 Homer E. Abele, Congressman 
 Hezekiah S. Bundy, Congressman 
 John Carey, Ohio House of Representatives (1995-2002) (2011), Ohio Senate (2003-2010), Chancellor of the Ohio Department of Higher Education (2013-2018)
 Timothy S. Hogan (1864-1925), Ohio Attorney General 
 Timothy S. Hogan (1909-1989), Federal District Judge
 Jeff Montgomery, MLB player
 John Sylvester, Vice Admiral United States Navy

References

External links

 City of Wellston
 Wellston Information
 Wellston City Schools
 Sylvester Memorial Public Library

Cities in Ohio
Cities in Jackson County, Ohio
1873 establishments in Ohio
Populated places established in 1873